Grayson County is the name of three counties in the United States:

Grayson County, Kentucky
Grayson County, Texas
Grayson County, Virginia